Armenia competed at the 2012 Summer Olympics in London, United Kingdom from 27 July to 12 August 2012. This was the nation's fifth consecutive appearance at the Olympics in the post-Soviet era.

The Armenian Olympic Committee sent a total of 25 athletes to the Games, 21 men and 4 women, to compete in 9 sports. The nation's team roughly shared the same size with Beijing and Sydney, only by the number difference between men and women. Armenia also marked its Olympic debut in taekwondo, competed by Arman Yeremyan, who was also the nation's flag bearer at the opening ceremony.

Armenia left London with one silver and one bronze medals.

Medalists

Athletics

Key
 Note – Ranks given for track events are within the athlete's heat only
 Q = Qualified for the next round
 q = Qualified for the next round as a fastest loser or, in field events, by position without achieving the qualifying target
 NR = National record
 N/A = Round not applicable for the event
 Bye = Athlete not required to compete in round

Men

Women

Boxing

Men

Gymnastics

Artistic
Men

Judo

Shooting

Men

Swimming

Men

Women

Taekwondo

Weightlifting

Men

Women

Wrestling

Key
  - Victory by Fall.
  - Decision by Points - the loser with technical points.
  - Decision by Points - the loser without technical points.

Men's freestyle

Men's Greco-Roman

References

2012 in Armenian sport
Nations at the 2012 Summer Olympics
2012